Vice-Admiral John George Lawrence Dundas,  (26 March 1952 – 3 November 1893) was a Royal Navy officer who served as the Assistant Chief of the Naval Staff from 1944 to 1945.

Biography
Born on 3 November 1893, Dundas was the son of the Hon. Cospatrick Thomas Dundas, DL, JP (1862–1906) and his wife Maud FitzWilliam (1871–1949), a daughter of the Hon. George Wentworth-FitzWilliam and a granddaughter of the 5th Earl FitzWilliam. Dundas's father was a grandson of the 1st Earl of Zetland and, when his elder brother inherited the earldom in 1873, Cospatrick was afforded the style of a peer's younger son. After his death in 1906, Maud remarried (in 1912) to the army officer and colonial administrator Major Sir Harry Edward Spiller Cordeaux.

Dundas entered the Royal Navy in 1907 as a cadet. He was commissioned as a full Sub-Lieutenant in December 1914 and promoted to Lieutenant a year later. During the First World War, Dundas served in torpedo boats and in HMS Hercules. Promoted to Lieutenant-Commander in December 1923, He completed training at the Naval Staff College in 1924 and served as the gunnery officer for the 2nd Cruiser Squadron. In 1928, he was promoted to Commander. In 1936, he studied at the Imperial Defence College. He commanded the sloop  in 1936–1937 and in 1938 was appointed assistant director of Plans at the Admiralty. Several months into the Second World War, he was given command of the light cruiser  (1940–1942), and was involved in escorting the Russian convoys. He created a new manoeuvre called the "Dundas zig-zag".

Dundas was Chief of Staff to the Commander-in-Chief of the Mediterranean Fleet from 1942 to 1943, when was appointed Chief of Staff, Levant. Promoted to Rear-Admiral in 1944, he was Assistant Chief of the Naval Staff from 1944 to 1945. He retired in 1946 and afforded the rank of Vice-Admiral in 1948. He died on 26 March 1952.

Citations

Bibliography
 

1893 births
1952 deaths
Royal Navy admirals of World War II
Royal Navy officers of World War I
Royal Navy officers of World War II